Eyawomano Doreen Amata (born 6 May 1988 in Lagos, Nigeria) is a female track and field athlete from Nigeria who specialises in the high jump event.

Amata represented Nigeria at the 2008 Olympic Games, finishing in 16th place in the overall-rankings. She claimed a gold medal for her native West African country at the 2007 All-Africa Games.

Amata competed for Nigeria at the 2016 Summer Olympics, but she did not qualify for the finals. She was the flag bearer for Nigeria during the closing ceremony.

Her personal bests in the event are 1.95 metres outdoors (Abuja 2008, Daegu 2011) and 1.93 metres (Banska Bystrica 2016).

Competition record

References

External links
 

1988 births
Living people
Sportspeople from Lagos
Nigerian female high jumpers
Olympic athletes of Nigeria
Athletes (track and field) at the 2008 Summer Olympics
Athletes (track and field) at the 2012 Summer Olympics
Athletes (track and field) at the 2016 Summer Olympics
Athletes (track and field) at the 2015 African Games
Athletes (track and field) at the 2018 Commonwealth Games
World Athletics Championships athletes for Nigeria
African Games gold medalists for Nigeria
African Games medalists in athletics (track and field)
African Games silver medalists for Nigeria
Athletes (track and field) at the 2019 African Games
Commonwealth Games competitors for Nigeria